For Life may refer to:

Music
 For Life Music, a Japanese record label

Albums
 For Life (Phases album), 2015
 "For Life" (EP), a 2016 EP by Exo
 For Life (Soul for Real album), 1996

Songs
 "For Life" (Isis Gee song), 2008
 "For Life" (Exo song), 2016
 "For Life", a song by 3 Years Hollow

Other
 Opposition Platform — For Life, a political party in Ukraine, formerly known as For Life
 For Life (TV series), a 2020 American television series